Edward Albert Feigenbaum (born January 20, 1936) is a computer scientist working in the field of artificial intelligence, and joint winner of the 1994 ACM Turing Award. He is often called the "father of expert systems."

Education and early life
Feigenbaum was born in Weehawken, New Jersey in 1936 to a culturally Jewish family, and moved to nearby North Bergen, where he lived until the age of 16, when he left to start college. His hometown did not have a secondary school of its own, and so he chose Weehawken High School for its college preparatory program. He was inducted into his high school's hall of fame in 1996.

Feigenbaum completed his undergraduate degree (1956), and a Ph.D. (1960), at Carnegie Institute of Technology (now Carnegie Mellon University). In his PhD thesis, carried out under the supervision of Herbert A. Simon, he developed EPAM, one of the first computer models of how people learn.

Career and research
Feigenbaum completed a Fulbright Fellowship at the National Physics Laboratory and in 1960 went to the University of California, Berkeley, to teach in the School of Business Administration. He joined the Stanford faculty in 1965 as one of the founders of its computer science department. He was the director of the Stanford Computation Center from 1965 to 1968.  He established the Knowledge Systems Laboratory at Stanford University. Important projects that Feigenbaum was involved in include systems in medicine, as ACME, Mycin, SUMEX, and Dendral. He also co-founded companies IntelliCorp and Teknowledge.

Since 2000 Feigenbaum is a Professor Emeritus of Computer Science at Stanford University. His former doctoral students include Peter Karp, Niklaus Wirth, and Alon Halevy.

Honors and awards
 1984: Selected as one of the initial fellows of the American College of Medical Informatics (ACMI)
 1986: Elected a member of the National Academy of Engineering for pioneering contributions to knowledge engineering and expert systems technology, and for leadership in education and technology of applied artificial intelligence.
 1994: Turing Award jointly with Raj Reddy for "pioneering the design and construction of large scale artificial intelligence systems, demonstrating the practical importance and potential commercial impact of artificial intelligence technology".
 1997: U.S. Air Force Exceptional Civilian Service Award
 2007: Inducted as fellow of the Association for Computing Machinery (ACM)
 2011: IEEE Intelligent Systems AI's Hall of Fame  for "significant contributions to the field of AI and intelligent systems".
 2012. Made fellow of the Computer History Museum "for his pioneering work in artificial intelligence and expert systems."
 2013. IEEE Computer Society Computer Pioneer Award for "pioneering work in Artificial Intelligence, including development of the basic principles and methods of knowledge-based systems and their practical applications".

Works

References

1936 births
Living people
Artificial intelligence researchers
Turing Award laureates
20th-century American Jews
Fellows of the Association for Computing Machinery
Carnegie Mellon University alumni
Fellows of the Association for the Advancement of Artificial Intelligence
Chief Scientists of the United States Air Force
Stanford University School of Engineering faculty
Members of the United States National Academy of Engineering
People from North Bergen, New Jersey
People from Weehawken, New Jersey
Presidents of the Association for the Advancement of Artificial Intelligence
Haas School of Business faculty
Weehawken High School alumni
21st-century American Jews